Barbarina Brand, Lady Dacre (née Ogle; 1768 – May 17, 1854), was an English poet, playwright, and translator. In addition to her writing, she sculpted, rode, was proficient in both French and Italian, and maintained an extensive correspondence with a circle of other literary women, including Joanna Baillie, Mary Russell Mitford, and Catherine Maria Fanshawe.

Early life and education

Barbarina Ogle was born in 1768. She was the third daughter of Admiral Sir Chaloner Ogle, 1st Baronet (died 1816), and Hester Thomas (daughter of John Thomas, Bishop of Winchester). Her brother was Admiral Sir Charles Ogle, 2nd Baronet. Her sister, Sophia, was married to General Sir Charles Asgill, 2nd Baronet.

Educated at home, she became "one of the most accomplished women of her time":

Career
In 1789, she married Valentine Henry Wilmot, of Farnborough, Hampshire, an officer in the guards, though they later separated. The couple had one daughter, Arabella Jane (Wilmont) Sullivan (1796–1839). After Wilmot's death in 1819, she married Thomas Brand, 20th Baron Dacre (1774–1851), later that same year. He died without issue.

Lady Dacre was one of the most accomplished and intellectual women of her time. In 1821, her poetical works were printed, but not published, in two volumes octavo, under the title of Dramas, Translations, and Occasional Poems. By Barbarina Lady Dacre. Some of these were dated in the 18th century. They included four dramas, the first of which, Gonzalvo of Cordova, was written in 1810. In the character of the great captain, the author followed the novel of Jean-Pierre Claris de Florian. The next, Pedrarias, a tragic drama, was written in May 1811; and its story was derived from Les Incas of Jean-François Marmontel. Her third dramatic work was Ina, a tragedy in five acts, the plot of which was laid in Saxon times in England. It was produced at Drury Lane on the 22 April 1815, under the management of Richard Brinsley Sheridan, to whose second wife, the daughter of Dr. Ogle, Dean of Winchester, the author was related. It was not sufficiently successful to induce its repetition, for in the Times of the 24 April 1815, was printer: "The second representation of the new tragedy called Ina is postponed till further notice, at the express desire of the authoress." It was printed in 1815 as produced on the stage; but in Lady Dacre's collected works, she restored "the original catastrophe, and some other parts which had been cut out." A fourth drama bore the title of Xarifa. It was remarked in the Quarterly Review, No. xcvii. that her, "Dramas, both tragic and comic, have been much and greatly admired." Lady Dacre's book contained also several translations of the sonnets of Petrarch, some of which seemed to have been privately printed at an earlier date. In 1823, when Ugo Foscolo produced his Essays on Petrarch, he dedicated the volume to Lady Dacre. The last 45 pages of Foscolo's book were occupied by Lady Dacre's translations from Petrarch.

In addition to her other accomplishments, Lady Dacre was an excellent amateur artist, and excelled in modelling animals, particularly the horse.

Later life and death
She edited in 1831 Recollections of a Chaperon, and in 1838, Tales of the Peerage and Peasantry, both written by her only daughter Arabella Sullivan (the author of Ellen Wareham). Arabella died in the year 1849, leaving by the Rev. Frederick Sullivan, Vicar of Kimpton, Hertfordshire, five children.

Her final years were marked by the loss of her hearing. She died on 17 May 1854.

Selected works
Dramas, Translations, and Occasional Poems (2 vols., privately printed in 1821), including
Gonzalvo of Cordova (1810, based on de Florian's Gonzalve de Cordone [1791]) 
Pedarias, a Tragic Drama (1811, based on Marmontel's Les Incas) 
Ina, a tragedy in five acts (produced at Drury Lane in 1815 under Sheridan; printed the same year)
Xarifa (drama)
Forty-five pages of her translated sonnets were published in Ugo Foscolo's Essays on Petrarch (1823) 
Editor, Recollections of a Chaperon by Arabella Sullivan (short stories, 1831)
Editor, Tales of the Peerage and Peasantry by Arabella Sullivan (short stories, 1835)
Translations from the Italian (privately printed in 1836)

References

Attribution

Bibliography 
"Dacre, Barbarina Brand." The Feminist Companion to Literature in English. Virginia Blain et al., eds. New Haven and London: Yale UP, 1990. 259.
 A Family Chronicle derived from Notes and Letters selected by Barbarina, the Hon. Lady Grey, edited by Gertrude Lyster. John Murray, Albemarle Street, London W. This correspondence claims that Barbarina Ogle was the daughter of Sawrey Gilpin, not Admiral Sir Chaloner Ogle.

External links 
 

1768 births
1854 deaths
18th-century English women writers
18th-century English writers
18th-century English poets
18th-century English dramatists and playwrights
18th-century British translators
19th-century English women writers
19th-century English writers
19th-century English poets
19th-century English dramatists and playwrights
19th-century British translators
English women dramatists and playwrights
English women poets
Dacre
Italian–English translators
Daughters of baronets
Deaf writers
English deaf people